Late Night Tales: Jon Hopkins is a mix album compiled by English producer and musician Jon Hopkins, released on 2 March 2015 as part of the Late Night Tales series. The mix includes tracks from artists such as Darkstar, Teebs, Nils Frahm, Letherette and Four Tet. It also features an exclusive cover version of Yeasayer’s "I Remember".

Track listing

References

External links
 Official Jon Hopkins website
 Late Night Tales: Jon Hopkins page

2015 compilation albums
Jon Hopkins
Jon Hopkins albums